Carlos Eduardo Felton González (born 22 August 1958) is a Mexican politician from the National Action Party. From 2006 to 2009 he served as Deputy of the LX Legislature of the Mexican Congress representing Sinaloa.

References

1958 births
Living people
Politicians from Sinaloa
People from Mazatlán
National Action Party (Mexico) politicians
21st-century Mexican politicians
Monterrey Institute of Technology and Higher Education alumni
Georgia Tech alumni
Members of the Congress of Sinaloa
Deputies of the LX Legislature of Mexico
Members of the Chamber of Deputies (Mexico) for Sinaloa